The NZR RM class Sentinel-Cammell was a steam-powered railcar operated by the New Zealand Railways Department (NZR). It was the only one of its type to operate in New Zealand, and one of only two steam railcars trialled in the country; the other was the Clayton steam railcar.

Overview 
In the early 20th century, NZR began experiments with railcars as an option to replace unprofitable regional locomotive-hauled carriage expresses and to provide efficient passenger service on rural branch lines that were served solely by slow mixed trains that carried both goods and passengers. Such mixed trains had slow schedules as they had to load and unload freight regularly, making their stops longer than passenger service would normally require. In 1925, a steam railcar was ordered from the Sentinel Waggon Works of Shrewsbury and Metro-Cammell of Birmingham, and when it entered revenue service, it was the first railcar to do so in the Auckland Region. It subsequently operated outside this region.

In service 
The railcar was not fast enough for the Melling Branch, so it was assigned to run a feeder service for the Night Limited express that ran between Wellington and Auckland. The feeder service operated from Thames along the Thames Branch and met the express at Hamilton (Frankton Junction) before returning to Thames. This service was not the sole domain of the Sentinel-Cammell steam railcar, it was sometimes operated by a carriage train hauled by steam locomotives such as the UD class. In 1928 it survived a collision with cows.

Withdrawal 
The Sentinel-Cammell steam railcar did not prove popular with passengers or crews and was not expanded into a full fleet. After a few years of service, it was quietly withdrawn and scrapped in 1931.

Notes

References

External links
 The Sentinel Cammell Steam Rail Car, Ohinemuri Regional History Journal 53, September 2009 – more details of the railcar on the Thames Branch.
 A Notable Rail Motor Service, The New Zealand Railways Magazine, Volume 2, Issue 5 (1 September 1927)
 1925 photo of interior

Sentinel locomotives
Railmotors
Railcars of New Zealand
Rail transport in New Zealand
Scrapped locomotives
Train-related introductions in 1925